Mark Donovan may refer to:
Mark Donovan (actor)
Mark Donovan (American football)
Mark Donovan (cyclist)
Mark Donovan (The Inbetweeners)